The 1977 Marshall Thundering Herd football team was an American football team that represented Marshall University in the Southern Conference (SoCon) during the 1977 NCAA Division I football season. In its third season under head coach Frank Ellwood, the team compiled a 2–9 record (0–4 against conference opponents) and was outscored by a total of 389 to 234. Bob Coleman, Ken Lawson, and Ed McTaggart were the team captains. The team played its home games at Fairfield Stadium in Huntington, West Virginia.

Schedule

References

Marshall
Marshall Thundering Herd football seasons
Marshall Thundering Herd football